The International Fantasy Award was an annual literary award for the best science fiction or fantasy book and, in 1951-1953, the best non-fiction book of interest to science fiction and fantasy readers. The IFA was given by an international panel of prominent fans and professionals in 1951-1955 and then again in 1957.

Winners
1951
Fiction: Earth Abides by George R. Stewart
Non-fiction: The Conquest of Space by Willy Ley & Chesley Bonestell
1952
Fiction: Fancies and Goodnights by John Collier
Non-fiction: The Exploration of Space by Arthur C. Clarke
1953
Fiction: City by Clifford D. Simak
Non-fiction: Lands Beyond by L. Sprague de Camp & Willy Ley
1954
Fiction: More Than Human by Theodore Sturgeon
1955
Fiction: A Mirror for Observers by Edgar Pangborn
1957
Fiction: The Lord of the Rings by J. R. R. Tolkien

External links
 Greg Pickersgill: The International Fantasy Award.
 Mark R. Kelly and Locus Publications: About the Awards – International Fantasy Award.

International Fantasy Award
Fantasy awards
International Fantasy Award